Yelverton is a locality in Western Australia's South West region in the local government area of the City of Busselton. At the 2021 census, it had a population of 72. It was named after timber merchant Henry Yelverton, who established a timber mill there in 1856. The area was part of the Group Settlement Scheme, and a school existed there from 1934 to 1937. Yelverton National Park is in the locality.

References

Timber towns in Western Australia
Capes region of South West Western Australia